Yevgeny Kafelnikov and David Rikl were the defending champions, but lost in the second round to Wayne Arthurs and Donald Johnson.

Trevor Kronemann and David Macpherson won the title by defeating qualifiers Andrea Gaudenzi and Goran Ivanišević 6–2, 6–4 in the final.

Seeds
The top four seeds receive a bye into the second round.

Draw

Finals

Top half

Bottom half

References

External links
 Official results archive (ATP)
 Official results archive (ITF)

1995 ATP Tour